Klaus Rohseano (born September 8, 1969) is a retired Austria international football player and a coach who managed SV Feldkirchen.

References

1969 births
Living people
Austrian footballers
Austria international footballers
Austrian football managers
LASK players
SW Bregenz players
FC Kärnten players
Association football defenders
People from Feldkirchen in Kärnten
Footballers from Carinthia (state)